Polypoetes colana is a moth of the family Notodontidae first described by Herbert Druce in 1893. It is found in southern Peru and northern Bolivia, on the eastern slope of the Andes.

References

Moths described in 1893
Notodontidae of South America